Hans-Peter Oberhuber (born 29 December 1962) is a German speed skater. He competed at the 1984 Winter Olympics and the 1988 Winter Olympics.

References

External links
 

1962 births
Living people
German male speed skaters
Olympic speed skaters of West Germany
Speed skaters at the 1984 Winter Olympics
Speed skaters at the 1988 Winter Olympics
People from Traunstein
Sportspeople from Upper Bavaria
20th-century German people